Elyas de Daneis was an English medieval university vice-chancellor. In 1230, Elyas de Daneis became the first Vice-Chancellor of the University of Oxford.

References

Bibliography
 

Year of birth unknown
Year of death unknown
English Roman Catholics
Vice-Chancellors of the University of Oxford
13th-century English people